Short Circuit: Live at the Electric Circus is a compilation album of songs recorded live at the Electric Circus, Manchester, on 1 and 2 October 1977, two concerts marking the last nights of the venue before it closed. Released by Virgin Records in June 1978, the album was originally only available on 10-inch blue, black, and yellow vinyl.

Warsaw performed on the second night; three months later they changed their name to Joy Division, which is how they are credited on the sleeve.

The album was the debut release for the Fall; Joy Division had self-released their debut 7-inch EP An Ideal for Living just 13 days earlier, and all the other bands had released debuts in 1977.

Release
Some original copies of the album came with a free 7-inch single, "Another Close Shave" by comedian John Dowie.

The album was reissued on CD in 1990 on the Blue Plate label.

Track listing
10" vinyl (Virgin VCL5003)
Side A
The Fall: "Stepping Out" – 2:36
John Cooper Clarke: "(You Never See a Nipple in The) Daily Express" – 1:03
Joy Division: "At a Later Date" – 3:00
The Drones: "Persecution Complex" – 2:50
Side B
Steel Pulse: "Makka Splaff (The Colly Man)" – 5:45
John Cooper Clarke: "I Married a Monster from Outer Space" – 1:30
The Fall: "Last Orders" – 3:08
Buzzcocks: "Time's Up" – 2:58

References

Sources

1978 live albums
1978 compilation albums
Virgin Records live albums
Virgin Records compilation albums
Punk rock compilation albums
Live punk rock albums